The Hot Jazz Duo is a live album by pianist Ron Edgeworth and vocalist Judith Durham. The album was recorded in Hobart and Newport in March and June 1978 and released in April 1979.

The album was re-released on CD in 2003.

Background
Durham and Edgeworth began performing jazz covers as The Hot Jazz Duo in 1976 and over the next few years, the duo performed across USA, UK and Australia. Steve Flemming said, "Durham and Edgeworth are not, thank god, traditional jazz purists.. but they are purists just the same, pure here meaning clean, clear and unembellished. Ron's piano always interesting often amazing in its fullest and Judy's voice sparkly and brassy."

Track listing
 LP/ Cassette
 A1	"My Buddy"	(Walter Donaldson, Gus Kahn) - 4:49
 A2	"Nobody Knows You When You're Down and Out" (Jimmy Cox) - 4:01
 A3	"Open Up Them Pearly Gates" (traditional) - 1:55
 A4	"A Good Man is Hard to Find" - 3:13	
 A5	"Body and Soul" (Edward Heyman, Robert Sour, Frank Eyton, Johnny Green) - 5:27
 B1	"Just a Closer Walk with Thee" (traditional) - 4:47
 B2	"Ain't Misbehavin''"	(Andy Razaf, Fats Waller, Harry Brooks) - 3:02
 B3	"Mood Indigo" (Duke Ellington, Barney Bigard, Irving Mills) - 5:07
 B4	"He Will Remember Me" - 2:57

External links
 "Hot Jazz Duo Live in Concert" at discogs.com

References

Judith Durham albums
1979 live albums
Live albums by Australian artists